Fonville is a surname. Notable people with the surname include:

Bryson Fonville (born 1994), American basketball player
Chad Fonville (born 1971), American baseball player
Charlie Fonville (1927–1994), American track and field athlete
John Fonville, American flutist and composer
Lester Fonville (born 1963), American basketball player
Richard H. Fonville (1882-1954), American politician